Janet Barresi (born March 6, 1952) is a former dentist and former Oklahoma Superintendent of Public Instruction who was elected on November 2, 2010 and began her term of service on January 10, 2011. Her term in office followed former Superintendent Sandy Garrett who chose not to run for re-election in 2010.  
In 2014, Barresi was defeated in the Republican Primary by Joy Hofmeister.  Hofmeister went on to defeat Democrat John Cox in the general election   Barresi's term ended in January 2015.

Barresi ran to be a United States Representative in the 2020 election. She ran in Oklahoma's 5th Congressional district and placed 4th in the Republican primary behind businesswoman Terry Neese, State Senator Stephanie Bice, and businessman David Hill.

References

Living people
Oklahoma Republicans
Oklahoma Superintendents of Public Instruction
Women in Oklahoma politics
21st-century American women politicians
1952 births
21st-century American politicians
Candidates in the 2020 United States elections